Clastoptera hyperici is a species of spittlebug in the family Clastopteridae. It is found in North America.

References

Articles created by Qbugbot
Insects described in 1920
Clastopteridae